Constituent National Assembly may refer to:

Historical
 1999 Constituent National Assembly, Venezuela
 2017 Constituent National Assembly, Venezuela
 Constituent National Assembly (South Korea), South Korea
 Constituent National Assembly (Austria) (1919–1920)
 Constituent National Assembly (Costa Rica) (1824), which established, among other institutions, the Supreme Court of Justice of Costa Rica
 Constituent National Assembly (Czechoslovakia) (1946–1948)
 National Constituent Assembly (France) (1789–1791)

See also
 Constituent assembly, including examples of national constituent and constitutional assemblies
 List of constituent assemblies